The American Journal of Psychotherapy is the official psychotherapy journal of the American Psychiatric Association. It began publishing in 1947.

The Journal is published 4 times a year. Since 2001, it incorporates the Journal of Psychotherapy Practice and Research.

Editors
The editor in chief emeritus is Toksöz Bayram Karasu, editor emeritus is Bruce J. Schwartz, M.D. The current editor in chief is Holly A. Swartz, M.D.; the managing editor is Demarie S. Jackson.

See also 
 List of psychotherapy journals

References

External links 
 

Psychotherapy journals
Quarterly journals
English-language journals
Publications established in 1947
1947 establishments in the United States